The 1991 Scheldeprijs was the 78th edition of the Scheldeprijs cycle race and was held on 21 April 1991. The race was won by Mario Cipollini of the Del Tongo team.

General classification

References

1991
April 1991 sports events in Europe
1991 in road cycling
1991 in Belgian sport